Thug Motivation may refer to:

"Thug Motivation", a song by Rod Wave from his 2020 album Pray 4 Love
Let's Get It: Thug Motivation 101, a 2005 album by Young Jeezy